Md. Abdur Razzak Akand is a Bangladesh Awami League politician and the former Member of Parliament of Joypurhat-2.

Career
Akand was elected to parliament from Joypurhat-2 as a Bangladesh Awami League candidate in 1986.

References

Awami League politicians
3rd Jatiya Sangsad members
Year of birth missing
Date of death unknown